In January 2021, 130 people were killed in intercommunal clashes in Darfur, Sudan.

On 16 and 17 January, 83 people were killed in clashes around an internally displaced persons camp in West Darfur. On 18 January, 47 people were killed in clashes between the Arab Rezegat tribe and the Falata community around a village in Taweel, South Darfur.

References

2021 in Sudan
2021 murders in Sudan
21st-century mass murder in Africa
January 2021 crimes in Africa
January 2021 events in Africa
Mass murder in 2021
Murder in Sudan
2021 clashes
2021 clashes
2021 clashes
Conflicts in 2021